St Cuthbert's Church, Winson Green is a former Church of England parish church in Birmingham.

History 

The church was started in 1863 as a mission from All Saints' Church, Hockley. Eventually funds were raised for a church building and it was designed by Bateman and Corser. It was consecrated on 24 October 1860 Part of the parish was taken to form a new parish of Bishop Latimer Memorial Church, Winson Green in 1904.

The church was hit by a bomb during the Second World War and despite reopening, did not last long. It was closed in 1960 and demolished in 1964. The church hall survives and is used as a Bengali community centre.

The parish was assigned back to Christ Church, Summerfield.

Organ 

The organ was installed by Bishop, Starr & Richardson. A specification of the organ can be found on the National Pipe Organ Register.

References 

Church of England church buildings in Birmingham, West Midlands
Churches completed in 1872